The Red Pony is a 1949 American rural drama film in Technicolor based on John Steinbeck's 1937 novella of the same name. Steinbeck also wrote the screenplay for this film.

Plot
The Tiflin family live in a remote ranch in the Salinas Valley in California.

Tom Tiflin, a young boy, is given a small pony by his father, Fred Tiflin. His grandfather (a Buffalo Bill type character) tells rambling and exaggerated tales of the west over meal times. Fred is tired of his stories but his daughter (Fred's wife) likes his eccentricity. Most of his stories revolve around his leading a wagon train cross country in the pioneer days.

Tom asks stable-helper Billy Buck (Mitchum) to help him raise and train it so that it can be ridden. Buck gives him a saddle and they name the pony Gabilan. Tom shows the pony to his young friends.

During a rainstorm, the pony escapes the stable and subsequently develops a fever. Despite Buck's efforts to nurse the pony, it develops strangles and requires a tracheotomy. Shortly after the procedure, the pony escapes from the farm. Tom follows the pony's hoofprints to a gully where it has died and is being eaten by vultures. He blames Buck for not saving the pony's life. Buck, feeling remorse, prepares to kill his own pregnant mare in order to give Tom a colt. Tom grows angry at Buck's willingness to sacrifice a horse and steals his knife. When they return to the stable, the foal has been born naturally, with both mother and colt surviving.

Screenplay adaptation
In adapting his novella into a screenplay, Steinbeck focused mainly on the chapters "The Gift" and "The Promise," and characters' names were changed from those in the book: Jody Tiflin became Tom and his parents Carl and Ruth became Fred and Alice. The film also features a much happier ending than does the novella; in the book, Billy Buck cannot deliver the foal naturally and kills the mare to perform a caesarean section to save the unborn foal. Other violent scenes, such as those in which Jody beats a vulture to death, were toned down or omitted entirely for the film adaptation.

Cast

Myrna Loy as Alice Tiflin
Robert Mitchum as Billy Buck
Louis Calhern as Grandfather
Shepperd Strudwick as Fred Tiflin
Peter Miles as Tom Tiflin
Margaret Hamilton as Teacher
Patty King as Jinx Ingals
Jackie Jackson as Jackie
Beau Bridges as Beau
Little Brown Jug as Little Brown Jug
Nino Tempo as Nino
Tommy Sheridan as Dale

Music
The film is notable because of the original score composed by Aaron Copland, which he also arranged and published as an orchestral suite.  Copland conducted London's New Philharmonia Orchestra in a recording of the music for Columbia Records, which was later reissued on CD by Sony Records.

Reception

Critical reception
In a contemporary review for The New York Times, film critic Bosley Crowther wrote: "[T]he story does ramble, and its several interlaced strands are often permitted to dangle or get lost in the leisurely account. An extraneous family situation involving the youngster's Ma and Pa, wherein the father has trouble with his ego, likewise confuses the plot. In directing the picture, Mr. Milestone has adopted a frankly casual style which further invests the proceedings with a languid quality."

Accolades
The film was nominated by the American Film Institute for its 2005 AFI's 100 Years of Film Scores list.

References

External links
 
 
 
 
 The Red Pony film clips at Turner Classic Movies
 

1949 films
American coming-of-age drama films
Films about horses
Films with screenplays by John Steinbeck
Films based on American novels
Films based on works by John Steinbeck
Films directed by Lewis Milestone
Films set in the 1940s
Films shot in California
Republic Pictures films
Films scored by Aaron Copland
1940s coming-of-age drama films
1949 drama films
1940s English-language films
1940s American films